This is the list of episodes for Late Night with Seth Meyers in 2018.

2018

January

February

March

April

May

June

July

August

September

October

November

December
</onlyinclude>

References

External links
 
 Lineups at Interbridge 

Episodes
2018 American television seasons
Lists of American non-fiction television series episodes
Lists of variety television series episodes